Jack Bennett (21 February 1913 – 17 May 1975) was a former Australian rules footballer who played with Melbourne in the Victorian Football League (VFL).

Notes

External links 

1913 births
1975 deaths
Australian rules footballers from Melbourne
Melbourne Football Club players